Purang County or Burang County
() is an administrative division of Ngari Prefecture in the Tibet Autonomous Region (TAR) of China. The county seat is Purang Town, known as Taklakot in Nepali.

Geography

Political geography
Purang County has TAR's south-western border with Nepal's Sudurpashchim and Karnali province, Darchula, Bajhang and Humla District. Further west, India's Uttarakhand State, Pithoragarh district and Chamoli district borders. Buddhist, Hindu and Jain pilgrims going to Lake Manasarovar and Mount Kailash enter from Nepal via Simikot, and from India via Dharchula.

The county is bounded by other counties in the Ngari Prefecture, including Zanda to the west, Gar to the northwest and Gê'gyai to the north. To the east is Zhongba County of Shigatse Prefecture.

Physical geography
It is an important Chinese customs point between Tibet, Nepal and India. Much of the county consists of river valleys of mountains and lakes such as Kangrinboqê (also known as Mount Kailash), The Naimonany Peak Gunrla and Lake Maponen Yamco Lake Manasarowar. The Karnali River fed by Mabja Zangbo is also a prominent geographical feature of the landscape. Wildlife commonly seen in the far south-western Tibetan county are wild donkeys, wild yaks, yellow goats, antelope, rock goat, lynxes, foxes, leopards and marmots.

Climate 
Bomê has a monsoon-influenced oceanic climate (Köppen climate classification Cwb).

Administrative divisions
The county is divided into Purang Town, and Hor Township. The county government is seated in the Jirang Neighborhood Committee in Purang Town.

History

Some historians believe that Tegla kar (Lying Tiger fort) near Purang was built during the Zhangzhung dynasty which was conquered by the Tibetan king Songtsen Gampo in the early 7th century CE. It became the main fort of the Purang Kingdom, in the 10th century under King Kori, one of the two sons of Tashi Gon, King of the Guge Kingdom. The Guge and Purang kingdoms were separated about the late 11th century, when king Logtsha Tsensong founded an independent realm. In about 1330 the 13th king Sonam De took over the important Khasa Malla kingdom (alias Yatse; not to be confused with the Malla dynasty of central Nepal) in western Nepal on the extinction of the local dynasty. The dynasty of Purang kings died out shortly before 1376. The territory was subsequently dominated in turns by the neighbouring kingdoms Guge and Mustang.

Economy
In 2010, the county reported a GDP of 140 million Renminbi, fiscal revenue of 4.27 million Renminbi, and retail sales totaling 26.97 million Renminbi.

Purang is an important barley-growing region and traditionally barley and salt from the salt lakes to the north of Taklakot made up the bulk of the trade to the south, while rice and a wide range of luxuries were traded back into Tibet from Nepal. The local villagers (known as Purangpa) carried the produce across the ranges into Nepal on caravans of sheep and goats during the summer and autumn. In winter and early spring the region is often in total isolation, cut off by heavy snow falls.

Transport 
China National Highway 219 passes through the county.

References

Bibliography
 
 

Counties of Tibet
Ngari Prefecture